The McGovern–Hatfield Amendment (alternately, Hatfield–McGovern Amendment) was a proposed amendment to an appropriations bill in 1970 during the Vietnam War that, if passed, would have required the end of United States military operations in the Republic of Vietnam by December 31, 1970 and a complete withdrawal of American forces halfway through the next year. It was the most outstanding defiance of executive power regarding the war prior to 1971. The amendment was proposed by Senators George McGovern of South Dakota and Mark Hatfield of Oregon, and was known as the "amendment to end the war."

The amendment was heavily opposed by the administration of President Richard Nixon. A revision of the amendment intended to gain more widespread support extended the deadline for withdrawal to the end of 1971. Nevertheless, the amendment was opposed by Nixon and his backers in the Congress, who argued that a withdrawal deadline would devastate the American position in negotiations with North Vietnam. On September 1, 1970, the amendment failed by a 55–39 margin.

McGovern's speech
Minutes before the voting began, McGovern appealed for support with the strongest and most emotional language he had ever used regarding the war:

According to historian Robert Mann, McGovern's brief, passionate speech shocked his Senate colleagues. As McGovern took his seat, most senators sat in stunned silence. "You could have heard a pin drop," recalled John Holum, McGovern's principal staff advisor on Vietnam. As the Senate prepared to begin voting on the amendment, one senator approached McGovern and indignantly told him that he had been personally offended by the speech. McGovern replied, "That's what I meant to do."

Text of the amendment

McGovern–Hatfield Amendment, H.R. 17123

(a) In accordance with public statements of policy by the President, no funds authorized by this or any other act may be obligated or expended to maintain a troop level of more than 280,000 armed forces of the United States in Vietnam after April 30, 1971.

(b) After April 30, 1971, funds herein authorized or hereafter appropriated may be expended in connection with activities of American Armed Forces in and over Indochina only to accomplish the following objectives:

(1) the orderly termination of military operations there and the safe and systematic withdrawal of remaining armed forces by December 31, 1971;

(2) to secure the release of prisoners of war;

(3) the provision of asylum for Vietnamese who might be physically endangered by withdrawal of American forces; and

(4) to provide assistance to the Republic of Vietnam consistent with the foregoing objectives; provided however, that if the President while giving effect to the foregoing paragraphs of this section, finds in meeting the termination date that members of the American armed forces are exposed to unanticipated clear and present danger, he may suspend the application of paragraph 2(a) for a period not to exceed 60 days and shall inform the Congress forthwith of his findings; and within 10 days following application of the suspension the President may submit recommendations, including (if necessary) a new date applicable to subsection b(1) for Congressional approval.

Notes

External links
 
 
 

United States foreign relations legislation
Congressional opposition to the Vietnam War
United States proposed federal legislation
United States–Vietnam relations
Vietnam War
1970 in the United States